The Cabinet Secretary for Economy, Fair Work and Culture, commonly referred to as the Economy Secretary or the Culture Secretary, was a Scottish Government Cabinet position with responsibility for the economy and culture of Scotland. The role was formed in February 2020, with the existing Cabinet Secretary for Culture, Tourism and External Affairs, Fiona Hyslop taking on additional responsibilities for economic matters (effectively adding the responsibilities of the former Cabinet Secretary for Economy, Jobs and Fair Work to her existing culture responsibilities). Responsibility for external affairs was transferred to the Cabinet Secretary for Government Business and Constitutional Relations, with the post being renamed Cabinet Secretary for the Constitution, Europe and External Affairs, whilst tourism moved to the Rural Economy brief. On 19 May 2021 the position ceased to exist with the creation of the Cabinet Secretary for Finance and the Economy and the Cabinet Secretary for the Constitution, External Affairs and Culture

The cabinet secretary is supported by two ministers, the Minister for Business, Fair Work and Skills and the Minister for Trade, Investment and Innovation.

History
The Europe and External Affairs brief was instituted in 2000 and combined with Education as the Minister for Education, Europe and External Affairs which was a Cabinet position in the McLeish Government. After 2001 the Europe and External Affairs Brief was abolished as a ministerial position. From 1999 to 2001, the Culture brief was a junior post in the Scottish Government as Deputy Minister for Culture and Sport. It was made into a Cabinet position as Minister for Culture and Sport in the First McConnell government from 2001 to 2003. The Second McConnell government from 2003 to 2007 combined the Culture and Sport brief with Tourism to form a Cabinet post in the Minister for Tourism, Culture and Sport. Culture was combined with External Affairs and Europe, to form a junior ministerial position, of Minister for Europe, External Affairs and Culture in the Salmond government following the 2007 Scottish Parliament election. In February 2009 the role was expanded to deal with constitutional issues this additional role was later removed in December 2009 following the publication of the National Conversation. After the 2011 Scottish Parliament election the office-holder returned to the Cabinet with the junior ministerial post being transformed into the Cabinet Secretary for Culture and External Affairs. After the 2016 Scottish Parliament election, the post was retitled Cabinet Secretary for Culture, Tourism and External Affairs.

Overview

Responsibilities
The responsibilities of the Cabinet Secretary for Economy, Fair Work and Culture include:

Architecture and built heritage
Broadcasting
Constitutional policy
Creative industries
Cross-government coordination of European and wider external relations, including post-Brexit relations
Culture of Scotland
Major events

Public bodies
The following public bodies reported to the Cabinet Secretary for the Constitution, External Affairs and Culture :
 Architecture and Design Scotland
 Creative Scotland
 Historic Environment Scotland
 National Galleries of Scotland
 National Library of Scotland
 National Museums of Scotland

List of office holders

Cabinet position

Junior Minister

See also
Scottish Parliament
Scottish Government

References

External links
Cabinet Secretary for Economy, Fair Work and Culture  on the Scottish Government website

Scottish Parliament
Europe, External Affairs and Culture
Ministers and ministries responsible for European affairs
Foreign relations of Scotland
Scotland